Elections to the Manipur Legislative Assembly were held in January 1980 to elect members of the 60 constituencies in Manipur, India. The Indian National Congress won the most seats as well as the popular vote, and Raj Kumar Dorendra Singh was reappointed as the Chief Minister of Manipur.

After the passing of the North-Eastern Areas (Reorganisation) Act, 1971, Manipur was converted from a Union Territory to a State and the size of its Legislative Assembly was increased from 30 to 60 members.

Result

Elected Members

See also 
 List of constituencies of the Manipur Legislative Assembly
 1980 elections in India

References

Manipur
1980
1980